Czech Braille is the braille alphabet of the Czech language. Like braille in other Latin-script languages, Czech Braille assigns the 25 basic Latin letters (not including "W") the same as Louis Braille's original assignments for French.

Czech Braille chart
With the exception of w, Czech follows international norms for the basic letters of the alphabet.

For letters with diacritics, there are two common strategies: (1) a dot 6 may be added (á, č, ď), or (2) the letter is reversed (ň, ó, ř, š, ť, ú, ý, ž). The Czech braille letter ř is the international form for w, so w has been assigned an idiosyncratic form, which is the reverse of ů. Í is a stretched i. É and ě are not derived from e, but are the reverse of each other.

The numerical prefix, derives the second options in the table (the digits, %, ‰, §).  indicates a capital letter,  that a word is in all caps, and  indicates lower case.

Slovak Braille
Slovak Braille is similar. Ô is equivalent to Czech Braille ů, and it does not have the letters ě or ř. In addition, there are four letters not found in Czech Braille:

References
Czech Republic United Organization for the Blind, 2006, Slepecká Braillova abeceda

French-ordered braille alphabets
Czech language